{{DISPLAYTITLE:C11H16N2O2}}
The molecular formula C11H16N2O2 (molar mass: 208.25 g/mol) may refer to:

 Aloracetam
 Aminocarb
 Carbenzide, or carbazic acid
 Pilocarpine
 Safrazine

Molecular formulas